Jean Simon may refer to:
 Jean Simon (cyclist), Belgian racing cyclist
 Jean Simon (bowls), Guernsey lawn bowler
 Jean Henri Simon, Belgian engraver and soldier